This article lists the team squads of the  2006 FIFA U-20 Women's World Championship, held in Russia from 17 August to 3 September 2006.

Group A

Australia
Coach:  Alistair Edwards

Brazil

New Zealand
Coach:  John Herdman

Players:

Russia

Group B

Canada

China PR

Nigeria

Finland

Group C

Germany

North Korea
Coach: Choe Kwang-sok

Mexico
Coach:  Leonardo Cuéllar

Switzerland

Group D

Argentina

France

DR Congo
Coach: Poly Bonghanya

United States

References

Fifa U-20 Women's World Championship Squads, 2006
FIFA U-20 Women's World Cup squads
2006 in youth sport